is a Japanese voice actor. He is signed with Y.M.O. (specifically the Love Love division that is made for voice acting) management. His given name Ryō is sometimes mistranslated as Rei.

Voice roles

Anime
 Assassination Classroom (Taiga Okajima) 
 Assassination Classroom 2nd Season (Taiga Okajima) 
 Beast Wars II (Ikard, DJ)
 Beast Wars Neo (Hydra)
 Cromartie High School (Yutaka Takenouchi)
 Death Note (Tota Matsuda)
 Ginga Legend Weed (Buru)
 Gyagu Manga Biyori (Various Roles)
 Hell Girl (Shinichi Muroi)
 Hunter x Hunter (Yamainu)
 Kill la Kill (Kusanosuke Yaguruma)
 Kodocha (Rei Sagami)
 Legendz (Ed)
 Les Misérables: Shōjo Cosette (Laigle)
 Medarot (Hikaru Agata)
 Monster Rancher (Allen)
 Ojarumaru (Katapi)
 PaRappa The Rapper (Gaster)
 Pokémon (Nando)
 Prince of Tennis (Koharu Konjiki, various voices)
 Reborn! (Ken Joushima)
 Sexy Commando Gaiden: Sugoiyo!! Masaru-san (Kojirou Satou a.k.a. Afro)
 Sugar Sugar Rune (Hiroshi)
 Suzuka (Kenji Kobayakawa)
 Transformers: Robots in Disguise (Mirage, Slapper)
 Yu-Gi-Oh! Duel Monsters (Ryuuji Otogi)
 Yu-Gi-Oh! 5D's (Jean)

Drama CDs
 Mainichi Seiten! series 1 (Yuuta Asuoo)
 Mainichi Seiten! series 2: Kodomo wa Tomaranai (Yuuta Asuoo)

References
 

1974 births
Male voice actors from Osaka Prefecture
Living people
Japanese male voice actors